Last Night, The Last Night or Last Nite may refer to:

Film 
 The Last Night (1928 film), a German silent film
 The Last Night (1934 film), a French film
 The Last Night (1936 film), a Soviet film
 The Last Night (1949 film), a German film by Eugen York
 Last Night (1964 film), an Egyptian film
 Last Night (1998 film), a Canadian film by Don McKellar
 Last Night (2010 film), a dramatic romance starring Keira Knightley and Sam Worthington
 Last Night (2017 film), a Philippine dark-romantic drama film, starring Piolo Pascual and Toni Gonzaga
 Last Night, a 2004 short starring Frances McDormand
 "Last Night", a mini-episode from the Doctor Who shorts "Night and the Doctor"

Music 
Last Night (band), a Romanian pop band formed in 2015

Albums 
 Last Night (Carey Bell album) (1973)
 Last Nite (Larry Carlton album) (1986)
 Last Night (His Name Is Alive album) (2002)
 Last Night (Moby album) (2008)
 Last Nite (P-Square album) (2003)

Songs 
 "Last Night" (Az Yet song)
 "Last Night" (Ian Carey song)
 "Last Night" (Diddy song)
 "Last Night" (Good Charlotte song)
 "Last Night" (Graace song)
 "Last Night" (Mar-Keys composition)
 "The Last Night" (Skillet song) (2007)
 "Last Night" (Lucy Spraggan song)
 "Last Nite", a song by The Strokes
 "Last Night" (The Vamps song)
 "Last Night" (Morgan Wallen song)
 "The Last Night", a song by Bon Jovi from Lost Highway
 "Last Night", a song by Buddy Holly from The "Chirping" Crickets
 "Last Night", a song by Vanessa Hudgens from Identified
 "Last Night", a song by Little Walter
 "The Last Night", a song by Aya Matsuura
 "Last Night", a 1982 song by Stephanie Mills
 "Last Night", a song by Motion City Soundtrack from Even If It Kills Me
 "Last Nite", a song by New Colony Six
 "Last Night (Kinkos)", a song by Omarion from Ollusion
 "Last Night", a song by The Partridge Family from Shopping Bag 
 "Last Night", a song by the Rhymefest from El Che
 "Last Night", a song by Justin Timberlake from Justified
 "Last Night", a song by Traveling Wilburys from Traveling Wilburys Vol. 1
 "Last Night", a song by Stephanie Mills from Tantalizingly Hot
 "Last Night", a song by Iron & Wine from Beast Epic

Other uses
 The Last Night (video game), an upcoming platform video game
 Last Night, a collection of short stories by James Salter, or the title story
 "The Last Night", a set of instructions given to his followers by 9/11 terrorist Mohamed Atta

See also 
 About Last Night (disambiguation)
 The Last Goodnight, an American alternative rock/pop band
 Last Knight (disambiguation)